Luis Humberto Salgado (1903 Cayambe - 1977 Quito) was an Ecuadorian composer. He was regarded as one of the most influential and prolific composers of his country.

Biography
He was taught by his father, the composer Francisco Salgado, a former student of the Italian composer Domenico Brescia (who championed nationalism in Chile and Ecuador before permanently settling down in the USA). During the 1920s, Salgado made a living as a pianist for silent films in Quito.  He later he worked as a critic, teacher, and choir and orchestra conductor; he also was director of the National Conservatory of Music in Quito.

In his essay Música vernácula ecuatoriana (Microestudio), published in 1952 in Casa de la Cultura Ecuatoriana, he expresses his thoughts about the creation of a national form. For example, he replaced the classical symphonic pattern (Allegro - Larghetto - Allegretto Scherzo - Allegro Vivace) with a sequence of Ecuadorian folk dances:

Ecuadorian Symphony
I Sanjuanito
II Yaraví
III Danzante
IV Albazo, Aire típico or Alza

Luis Humberto Salgado was the leading figure of his generation.  His symphonic suite Atahualpa (1933), his Suite coreográfica (1946), the ballets El amaño (1947), and El Dios Tumbal (1952) and other works show strong nationalistic feeling.  Salgado also wrote two operas, Cumandá (1940, rev. 1954); Eunice (1956-7) that were never produced.  Salgado was not an exclusively nationalist composer, as the varied style of his eight symphonies shows.  In his later years, he even relied on atonality and tried his hand at 12-note composition. – Béhague, Gerard. 2001. "Ecuador.  Art Music"

Though only two of his operas are mentioned in most music literature, he composed another two, together with nine symphonies, several concertos, several ballets. He was both a nationalist and a modernist composer. As early as 1944, he wrote Sanjuanito Futurista for piano, using the rhythm of a traditional Ecuadorian dance within the dodecaphonic writing style. He was in his early forties when he started experimenting with new techniques but was not acknowledged as a modernist until later in his life.

Compositions

Discography 
 Piano Music by Ecuadorian Composers  CD. Piano: [Alex Alarcon Fabre], 
Brindis por la peaña (alza) (Luis Humberto Salgado)
Nocturnal (pasillo) (Luis Humberto Salgado)
Other works by: Gerardo Guevara, Corsino Duran, Claudio Aizaga, Juan Pablo Muñoz Sanz

Souvenir de l'Amérique du Sud (CD) (piano, Marcelo Ortiz, works by: Gerardo Guevara, Sixto María Durán and Miguel Ángel Casares)
 I. Amanecer de trasnochada (pasillo) - Luis H. Salgado
 Brindis al pasado (pasillo) - Luis H. Salgado
 II. Romance nativo (sanjuanito) - Luis H. Salgado
 VI. Nocturnal (pasillo) - Luis H. Salgado

Writings
 Salgado, Luis H. Música vernácula ecuatoriana (Microestudio), published in 1952 by Casa de la Cultura Ecuatoriana
 Salgado, Luis H. Proyecciones de la música contemporánea, published in September 1960 by Ritmo, Madrid, Spain.

References
 Apel, Willi. Harvard Dictionary of Music, Harvard University Press, 1969, p. 253.
 Béhague, Gerard. 2001. "Ecuador.  Art Music". The New Grove Dictionary of Music and Musicians, second edition, edited by Stanley Sadie and John Tyrrell. London: Macmillan Publishers; New York: Grove's Dictionaries of Music.
 Bull, Storm Index to biographies of contemporary composers. New York: Scarecrow Press, 1964, p. 405
 Composers of the Americas Biographical data and catalog of their works Volume 4. Washington, D.C.: Secretaria General, organizacion de los Estados Americanos, 1958.
 Chronological catalog of the works of the Ecuadorian composer Luis H. Salgado Boletin interam. mus., no.1 (Sep 1957), p. 45-50
 Diccionario de la música española e hispanoamericana (DMEH). Published by Sociedad General de Autores y Editores (SGAE) and Instituto Nacional de las Artes Escénicas y de la Música (INAEM) from the Spanish Ministerio de Educación, Cultura y Deporte.
 Pérez Pimentel, Rodolfo. In: Diccionario Biográfico del Ecuador, Guayaquil 1987.
 Robijns, Jozef; Zijlstra, Miep. Algemene muziek encyclopedie hoofdred., J. Robijns en Miep Zijlstra. Haarlem: De Haan, [1979]-1984
 Rosner, Helmut; Bulling, Burchard; Frank, Paul; Noetzel, Florian. Kurzgefasstes Tonkunstler Lexikon Fortfuhrt von Burchard Bulling, Florian Noetzel, Helmut Rosner Wilhelmshaven: Heinrichshofen, 1974. Note: Zweiter Teil: Erganzungen und Erweiterungen seit 1937
 Slonimsky, Nicolas. Music of Latin America. New York: Thomas Y. Crowell, 1945, p. 374.
 Walker, John L. "The Younger Generation of Ecuadorian Composers", Latin American Music Review University of Texas- Volumen 22, Número 2, Fall 2001.
 Morris, Mark. The Pimlico Dictionary of Twentieth Century Composers. Pimlico, 1999.
 Stevenson, Robert. "Quito". The New Grove Dictionary of Music and Musicians, second edition.
 Opus, no. 31. Issue dedicated to Luis H. Salgado. Edited by Arturo Rodas. Central Bank of Ecuador . Quito, January 1989.
 Luis H. Salgado in Grandes Compositores Ecuatorianos, edited by Pablo Guerrero G.  CONMUSICA. Quito. January 2001.
 Wong Cruz, Ketty. Luis H. Salgado, un Quijote de la música. Central Bank of Ecuador & Casa de la Cultura Ecuatoriana Benjamín Carrión. 2004.

Notes

External links
 Edufuturo 
 
 La Música en el Ecuador, Mario Godoy Aguirre

1903 births
1977 deaths
20th-century classical composers
20th-century male musicians
Ecuadorian composers
Ecuadorian opera composers
Male classical composers
People from Cayambe, Ecuador